Bonar Colleano (born Bonar Sullivan; 14 March 192417 August 1958) was an American stage and film actor based in the United Kingdom.

Biography

Early life
Colleano was born Bonar Sullivan in New York City. He had childhood experiences with the Ringling Brothers Circus and in his family's famous circus.

He moved to the United Kingdom when he was 12 so his family could appear at the London Palladium. He spent several years performing in music halls. When war broke out in 1939, he began entertaining troops in Britain and was not called up for either nation's military forces. In 1941 he was in a revue Piccadixie.

Film career
Colleano's first important role came with the popular wartime drama The Way to the Stars (also known as Johnny in the Clouds, 1945), playing an American airman.

He played American servicemen in Wanted for Murder (1946), A Matter of Life and Death (1946), and While the Sun Shines (1947).

Colleano played an Italian in One Night with You (1948), and was in Good-Time Girl (1948) and Sleeping Car to Trieste (1948). He worked regularly in radio, appearing in a revue Navy Mixture, and had a lead part in Once a Jolly Swagman (1949).

Leading roles
Colleano's reputation shot up when cast in the role of Stanley Kowalski in the original English stage production of A Streetcar Named Desire (1949) at the Aldwych Theatre, London, directed by Laurence Olivier and co-starring Vivien Leigh.

His film parts got better. Give Us This Day (1949) was set in the U.S. but shot in England. He was a romantic lead in Dance Hall (1950).

It led to lead roles in films starting with Pool of London (1951) and A Tale of Five Cities (1952). The latter enabled him to display some of his circus skills. He went to the US and starred in a Hollywood production, Stanley Kramer's Eight Iron Men (1952).

He went back to Britain to play the lead in Is Your Honeymoon Really Necessary? (1953), a comedy with Diana Dors, and in Escape by Night (1953).

Support parts
Colleano had another Hollywood role, a support, in Flame and the Flesh (1954), shot in England and Italy.

He went back to support parts in British films with Time Is My Enemy (1954) and The Sea Shall Not Have Them (1955).

Colleano had good support roles in the oddball Shakespeare derivation Joe MacBeth (1955) and Stars in Your Eyes (1956).

Warwick Productions
Warwick Productions used him in Zarak (1956). They liked his work and kept him on for Interpol (1957), Fire Down Below (1957), No Time to Die (1958) and The Man Inside (1958). He was also in Death Over My Shoulder (1958).

In May 1958 Colleano admitted to debts of nearly £10,000 due to extravagant living, including more than £8,000 owed to the tax office. He said he had earned around £9,000 a year for the past five years.

Personal life
Colleano was from a well known Australian circus family and was a nephew of Con Colleano, the first tightrope walker to perform a forward somersault on the wire. In 1946, he married actress Tamara Lees, but the couple divorced in 1951. His second wife was actress Susan Shaw, who descended into alcoholism after his death. Their son Mark Colleano is also an actor. In 1950, while living in the U.K., he fathered future Average White Band drummer Robbie McIntosh. Colleano was not married to McIntosh's mother.

Death
Colleano died in 1958 at the age of 34, when he crashed his sports car (a Jaguar XK140) in Birkenhead shortly after leaving the Queensway Tunnel. He was driving back from Liverpool's New Shakespeare Theatre, where he had been appearing in a stage production of Will Success Spoil Rock Hunter?. His passenger, fellow actor and friend Michael Balfour, required 98 stitches, but eventually recovered.

Legacy
In the lyrics of Ian Dury and the Blockheads' 1979 song "Reasons to Be Cheerful, Part 3", Colleano was included in the list of reasons to be cheerful.

Filmography

References

Citations

External links

 
 
 The Importance of Being Bonar https://web.archive.org/web/20080407000529/http://www.november3rdclub.com/08-07/nonfiction/williams.html

1924 births
1958 deaths
American male film actors
American male stage actors
Male actors from New York City
Road incident deaths in England
American people of Australian descent
American emigrants to England
Music hall performers
20th-century American male actors